The 2022 EMF Euro is the ninth edition of the EMF miniEURO for national Small-sided football teams, and the fifth governed by the European Minifootball Federation. It takes place in Košice, Slovakia, from 4 to 11 June 2012.

The final tournament includes 24 teams.

Draw

Group stage

Group A

  1 - 4 
  2 - 0 
  3 - 1 
  1 - 1 
  4 - 3 
  4 - 0

Group B

  2-0 
  0-0 
  1-5 
  3-1 
  0-1 
  5-1

Group C

  4-1 
  0-2 
  5-2 
  2-0 
  1-3 
  3-1

Group D

  5-0 
  0-2 
  1-5 
  6-1 
  8-0 
  2-2

Group E

  1-1 
  1-1 
  3-1 
  4-1 
  1-3 
  1-4

Group F

  2-1 
  1-0 
  2-5 
  2-1 
  4-2 
  2-2

Knockout stage

Bracket

Round of 16

Quarter-finals

Semi-finals

Bronze medal game

Final

Final ranking

Goalscorers

References

External links
 EMF Euro 2022 official website
 European Minifootball Federation on Facebook
 Euro Minifootball Federation on Twitter
 Minifootball Europe on Instagram
 Euro Minifootball on YouTube

2022
International association football competitions hosted by Slovakia
2022 in European sport
2021–22 in Slovak football
Sport in Košice
June 2022 sports events in Slovakia